George Sneddon McMillan (15 March 1930 – 25 December 2019) was a Scottish professional footballer. He made one appearance in the Scottish top flight with Aberdeen and in the English football league with Wrexham.

References

1930 births
2019 deaths
Aberdeen F.C. players
Wrexham A.F.C. players
Brechin City F.C. players
Montrose F.C. players
Scottish footballers
Association football wing halves